Bury Football Club is an inactive English association football club based in Bury, Greater Manchester, whose team last played in EFL League Two, the fourth tier of English football, in the 2018–19 season. The team are known as "The Shakers", and play in white shirts and navy blue shorts. Gigg Lane, one of the world's oldest football grounds, has been the club's home venue since 1885. The club has long-standing rivalries with near neighbours Bolton Wanderers, Oldham Athletic and Rochdale. Established in 1885, Bury was a founder member of the Lancashire League in 1889 and crowned champions in 1890–91 and 1891–92, before being elected to the Football League in 1894.

Bury won the Second Division in 1894–95 and earned promotion to the First Division in which they played for 17 seasons. They won the FA Cup in 1900 with a 4–0 victory over Southampton and again in 1903 with a record 6–0 win over Derby County. Bury were relegated to the Second Division at the end of the 1911–12 season and were there for twelve years until securing promotion as runners-up in 1923–24. They were relegated in 1928–29, their last top-flight season. In 1956–57, they dropped into the third tier for the first time but won promotion as champions of the Third Division under Dave Russell in 1960–61. From 1967 to 1971, they had one promotion and three relegations, the last of which was from the Third to the Fourth Division. 

Bury won promotion at the end of the 1973–74 campaign and remained in the Third Division until 1979–80. In 1995, Stan Ternent took over as team manager. He led the team back to the second tier for the first time in 28 years after securing two consecutive promotions in 1995–96 and 1996–97. The club stayed there for just two seasons before being relegated twice in four seasons. They secured promotion out of League Two in 2010–11. After that, Bury switched between Leagues One and Two, being twice relegated (in 2012–13 and 2017–18) and twice promoted (in 2014–15 and 2018–19). Bury finished the 2018–19 season as runners-up in League Two, earning promotion to League One for the 2019–20 season. However, the club was unable to begin the season because of longstanding financial difficulties, and was expelled from the Football League. 

In November 2020, the club was placed into administration. In February 2022, Bury fans' group Est.1885 completed the purchase of Gigg Lane from the administrator and announced that they have acquired the trading name, history and memorabilia of Bury FC. After the sale was completed, efforts began to bring professional football back to Bury. In October 2022 supporters were urged to vote in a poll regarding a potential amalgamation of the Bury Football Club Supporters' Society (who own Gigg Lane and the "Bury FC" trading name) and the Shakers Community Society (who own a separate phoenix club called Bury AFC). If the merger was agreed, a new society - The Football Supporters' Society of Bury - would be formed, based at Gigg Lane, while Bury AFC would change its playing name to Bury Football Club. However, the proposals failed to reach the required 66% threshold from both societies, and a second poll was organised in early 2023.

History

Formation and early years (1885–1895)
Bury Football Club was founded on 24 April 1885 after Aiden Arrowsmith, a local enthusiast, had brokered two meetings between church teams Bury Wesleyans and Bury Unitarians at the Waggon & Horses Hotel and the Old White Horse Hotel. It was agreed from the outset that the team should be professional. The FA had recently legitimised professionalism but it was still a controversial topic. Ahead of the 1885–86 season, the club leased a plot of land on Gigg Lane from the Earl of Derby's estate. On 12 September 1885, the first match played there was a friendly against a team from Wigan and Bury won 4–3.

The club first entered the FA Cup in 1887–88 and were drawn to play Blackburn Rovers away from home in the first round. They travelled to Ewood Park but scratched before the game. The two teams played a friendly match instead, which Bury lost heavily by 10–0. Some sources, including the Rec.Sport.Soccer Statistics Foundation (RSSSF), have recorded the friendly as a first-round FA Cup tie. The Football Association, however, lists the result as a walkover by Blackburn, recognising that Bury withdrew from the competition. This is confirmed by the Lancashire Evening Post's evening edition of the same day, which reported that "Bury scratched before the match, and played an ordinary game". Bury FC do not include the tie in their complete FA Cup record.

Bury were founder members of the Lancashire League in 1889, finishing as runners-up in the inaugural 1889–90 competition. They won the championship the next two seasons. In 1891–92, Bury were Lancashire Cup winners for the first time, and they have won this competition a total of eleven times, most recently in 2017–18. The club's nickname—"The Shakers"—was first used at the 1892 Lancashire Cup final against Everton. Before the match, J. T. Ingham, the club's chairman manager, reportedly inspired the players by saying: "We shall shake 'em! In fact, we are the Shakers". His words were popularised by the media and the club subsequently adopted the term as their official nickname. Also in 1891–92, Bury contested an FA Cup tie for the first time when they defeated Witton and Heywood Central before losing to Blackpool after a replay in the third qualifying round.

In 1894, the club was elected to the Football League. In their first season, 1894–95, they won the Second Division title by a nine-point margin and beat Liverpool, the First Division's bottom club, in the test match to gain promotion.

1895–1929
Bury retained their top-flight status for seventeen seasons until they were relegated to the Second Division after the 1911–12 season (they finished in the relegation positions in the 1904–05 season but avoided relegation when the capacity of Division One was increased from eighteen to twenty clubs). In 1900 and 1903, Bury won the FA Cup, scoring ten goals in the two finals without conceding any.

In the 1900 final, they beat Southern League team Southampton 4–0. Bury's run to the final was remarkable in that they were drawn away from home in every round but won through with victories over Burnley, Notts County, cup holders Sheffield United and Nottingham Forest. The semi-final against Forest was played at Stoke and ended 1–1 after Bury missed a penalty. A replay was held at Bramall Lane in Sheffield and Bury began disastrously by conceding two goals in the first two minutes. Charlie Sagar pulled one back after 55 minutes and then Jasper McLuckie equalised with only five minutes to go. Extra time was played and Sagar scored the winner after 110 minutes of play. The final at the old Crystal Palace ground was played in a heatwave and Bury, captained by Jack Pray, dominated from the start. The goals in a one-sided match were scored by McLuckie (2), Willie Wood and Jack Plant. The players were on a win bonus of £10 each in the final, ten times more than their usual £1 per match bonus.

Three years later, Bury did not concede a goal in any round. En route to the final against Derby County, Bury defeated Wolverhampton Wanderers, Sheffield United, Notts County and Aston Villa. As in 1900, the final was played at the old Crystal Palace ground in south London. A crowd of 63,102 attended. As the two teams wore identical kits, agreement on colours for the day was necessary and they both changed with Bury wearing Cambridge blue shirts and navy shorts while Derby chose red shirts and black shorts.

Six of Bury's 1900 finalists were in the 1903 team, led by skipper George Ross who scored the opening goal after 20 minutes. Derby's keeper Jack Fryer played despite an existing injury which he aggravated early in the second half when he was trying to prevent Charlie Sagar from scoring Bury's second goal. As a result, Fryer was forced to leave the field and, as substitutes were not allowed then, one of the full-backs deputised in goal and their team was down to ten men for most of the last forty minutes. Bury scored three goals in four minutes just before the hour was up and their sixth after 76 minutes. Joe Leeming scored the third and last goals. Willie Wood and Jack Plant scored the other two. The final was a no contest and Derby were lambasted by the press for their poor performance. One reporter commented that, but for being merciful, Bury should have scored twenty. Bury's 6–0 win established an FA Cup final record for the biggest winning margin. Bury remained sole holders of the record until the 2019 final in which Manchester City defeated Watford by the same score. The ball used in the 1903 final is on display at the National Football Museum.

Until 1907, the team was always managed by one or more committee members. Club secretary Harry Spencer Hamer is believed to have been in charge of the team in both the 1900 and 1903 FA Cup finals, but he was never formally appointed team manager. The first specialist team manager was goalkeeper Archie Montgomery who was appointed on 1 February 1907. He was in charge when the team were relegated in 1912 and stayed on until 30 April 1915 when he was dismissed because of the club's lack of income in wartime. The club had a windfall in 1922 when Edward Stanley, 17th Earl of Derby, unexpectedly gifted them with the freehold of Gigg Lane. The team returned to the First Division for a five-season spell in 1924 and achieved their highest-ever league position, fourth, in 1925–26. Bury have not played in the top flight since relegation back to the Second Division in 1929.

1929–1969

Striving to recover First Division status, Bury had four top six finishes in Division Two in the 1930s. The closest that they have ever come to a top flight return was in 1936–37 when they finished third (only the first two teams were promoted).

With first-class league and cup football suspended for the duration of World War II, regional wartime competitions were organised in which Bury took part. Like all other clubs, they often relied on guest players because of service calls. There were ten regional leagues in 1939–40 and Bury were in the North West League, finishing as champions. The team were unbeaten in a sequence of 16 matches from October to February. On 30 December 1939, they played a friendly against Stoke City which resulted in a 7–6 win for Bury.

Bury were close to relegation from the Second Division several times after the war. They finally dropped into the Third Division North for the first time in 1957. 1957–58 was that division's last season before the regional sections were amalgamated into national Third and Fourth Divisions.

Under manager Dave Russell, a young Bury team were Third Division champions in 1960–61. They spent seven of the next eight seasons back in the Second Division with a best position of eighth in 1962–63. In the 1962–63 Football League Cup, they reached the semi-final but lost 4–3 on aggregate to eventual winners Birmingham City. For three seasons from 1963, Bury's best player was the future England midfielder Colin Bell, who was team captain while still a teenager. He transferred to Manchester City in 1966 and Bury were relegated the following season. They bounced straight back as Third Division runners-up in 1968 but went down again in 1969.

1969–2000
In 1971, relegation from Division Three took Bury into the Fourth Division for the first time. They gained promotion in 1974 and spent six seasons in the Third Division before the next relegation. The club celebrated its centenary in 1985 by gaining promotion back to the Third Division.

Bury came close to promotion from the Third Division in both 1990 and 1991 when they finished fifth and seventh respectively to qualify for the play-offs. They were eliminated at the semi-final stage in both play-offs, losing 2–0 on aggregate to Tranmere Rovers in 1990 and 2–1 on aggregate to neighbours Bolton Wanderers in 1991. Relegation followed in 1992 and then Bury qualified for the fourth-tier play-off in 1993 by finishing seventh but, yet again, lost their semi-final tie by going down 1–0 on aggregate to York City. Bury were back in the play-offs again in 1995 after finishing fourth. This time, they won their semi-final by beating Preston North End 2–0 on aggregate and so went to Wembley for the final, where they lost 2–0 to Chesterfield.

The club then enjoyed a resurgence under manager Stan Ternent who engineered two successive promotions in the mid-1990s. In 1996, third place in what was now the fourth-tier Division Three, followed by the third-tier Division Two title in 1996–97, brought Bury back to the second tier for the first time in 30 years. They went back to the third tier on the last day of the 1998–99 season on the basis of having a lower goals scored total than Port Vale, the League having decided to use this metric rather than goal difference as its tie-breaker. Bury's goal difference was higher than that of Port Vale, and the League reinstated goal difference as the tie-breaker for the following season.

2001–2019
In 2001–02, financial problems caused by the collapse of ITV Digital brought the club into administration and to the brink of folding. A supporters' campaign raised enough money to keep the club afloat, and in recognition of his role within that process, UEFA presented club press officer Gordon Sorfleet with their Best Supporter award for 2001–02. Bury were relegated to fourth-tier Division Three at the end of that season. They finished seventh in 2003 and qualified for the play-offs but, yet again, their semi-final hoodoo struck and they were beaten 3–1 on aggregate by Bournemouth.

In May 2005, Bury became the first (and to date the only) football club to score a thousand goals in each of the top four tiers of the English football league. A year later, in December 2006, the club was expelled from the FA Cup after they were found to have fielded an ineligible player in a second-round replay win against Chester City. In addition to that debacle, the team's 2006–07 league form was poor and they eventually finished in 21st place, the club's lowest-ever position, narrowly avoiding relegation from the Football League.

In the 2008–09 season, newly appointed manager Alan Knill, a former Bury player, led the team to a fourth-place finish, missing automatic promotion by a single goal; in the play-off semi-final, Bury were beaten on penalties by Shrewsbury Town after a 1–1 aggregate draw. Towards the end of the 2010–11 season, with the team chasing promotion, Knill and assistant Chris Brass left the club for Scunthorpe United. Youth team manager Richie Barker took over as caretaker manager and secured the club's promotion to League One, the team finishing second.

In December 2012, Bury were placed under a transfer embargo after falling into financial difficulty as a result of poor attendance figures, and ended up being relegated at the end of the season. Property investor Stewart Day became chairman of the club in May 2013 and later that year he noted that £1.5 million had been invested in the club, mostly to pay off debt. Bury finished the 2014–15 League Two season in third place with a club-record points haul of 85 and earned promotion back to third-tier League One, where they spent the next three seasons. The team finished bottom of the 2017–18 EFL League One table and returned to League Two for the second time in five seasons.

In May 2018, the former Bury striker Ryan Lowe was appointed first-team manager on a two-year contract, having been caretaker-manager twice during 2017–18 after two other managers were sacked. In June 2018, Lee Dykes became the club's first sporting director and introduced a youth development strategy designed to fast-track academy players into the first team at the earliest opportunity. Having three times reached the northern semi-final stage of the EFL Trophy in its earlier incarnations, Bury in the 2018–19 tournament advanced to the national semi-final where they lost 0–3 at home to Portsmouth. The team had a good season in League Two and, during the winter months, went 14 successive matches unbeaten before winning promotion to League One after a 1–1 draw at Tranmere Rovers on 30 April.

2019–2021 financial crisis, EFL expulsion and administration

Winding-up petition, December 2018 – July 2019 
Businessman Steve Dale bought the club from Stewart Day for £1 in December 2018 and, in February 2019, paid an outstanding tax bill to avoid a HM Revenue and Customs (HMRC) winding-up order. However, financial problems resurfaced on 2 April after staff and players did not receive their March salaries on time. On 10 April, former head coach Chris Brass, claiming to be a creditor of the club, issued a winding-up petition to be heard in the High Court. Amid the EFL's "extreme concern" about the club's situation, there was doubt about whether the home game against Colchester United on 13 April would be played (it was; Bury won 2–0). On 12 April, the club said the outstanding wage bill would be settled within the next seven days. Meanwhile, the winding-up petition was adjourned until 15 May (after the end of the league season). In addition to Brass's claim, HMRC was claiming approximately £277,000.

On 25 April, Dale said the club's financial problems were "far in excess" of what he understood when he took over, and placed the club on the open market. Around £1.6m was needed to pay wages, HMRC and pensions to the end of May, with only £180,000 income expected during that period. On 19 June, a High Court hearing on the winding-up petition was adjourned until 31 July, to allow additional time for a potential sale.

To secure the club's future, Dale proposed a Company Voluntary Arrangement (CVA) to ensure payment of the club's football creditors in full while unsecured creditors, including HMRC, would receive 25% of monies owed. That was approved by creditors on 18 July. As a result, the winding-up petition was dismissed by the High Court on 31 July.

EFL intervention, July–August 2019 
Under EFL rules, a CVA is an insolvency event and left the club liable to a 12-point deduction ahead of the 2019–20 league season. Bury's preparation for the new season was further impacted by the loss of manager Ryan Lowe and several members of the first-team squad.

On 25 July, the EFL sought further details on how Bury would satisfy the CVA; without proof of the club's financial viability, Bury could be expelled from the EFL. Satisfactory proof was not provided, and on 29 July the club's opening league match of the season (against MK Dons at Gigg Lane) was suspended, as were four further league games. An EFL Cup tie was cancelled and awarded to Sheffield Wednesday.

On 8 August, Bury was given 14 days to provide the EFL with a plan to pay off outstanding creditors. The EFL repeatedly insisted it was working with the club to try and resolve the problems, but Bury faced expulsion if financial order could not be restored by 23 August.

On 12 August, Dale said he would consider selling the club after staff 'implored' him to accept a newly received offer to buy the club, but, on 20 August, he rejected a deal that would have secured the survival of the club, believing he could get a better offer. Bury North MP James Frith wrote to EFL chair Debbie Jevans asking for the expulsion deadline to be extended;  Andy Burnham, the Mayor of Greater Manchester, also requested an extension. On 22 August, the EFL gave an extra 48 hours to avoid expulsion after it emerged that four parties were interested in a takeover. Late on 23 August, Dale was said to have agreed a sale to analytics company C&N Sporting Risk. The following morning, an EFL board meeting gave Bury until 17:00 BST on Tuesday 27 August to complete the sale, though Jevans later said a further short extension might be granted if the sale was very close to conclusion. Shortly before the deadline, however, C&N Sporting Risk pulled out of the deal saying it was "unable to proceed".

At around 23:00 BST on 27 August, the EFL announced that Bury's membership of the league had been withdrawn. Bury were the first club to be expelled from the Football League since Maidstone United in 1992. After the expulsion, it emerged that a late bid from a Brazilian-backed potential buyer had been rejected. The Insolvency Practitioners Association said it would investigate Bury's CVA over allegations that Dale had tried to engineer a payout to a newly formed company, RCR Holdings, run by his daughter's partner, and 140 youth players were released by Bury's academy.

Post-expulsion events 
On 30 August, Bury was "actively considering" legal action against the EFL over its expulsion. After local MP James Frith said he would propose that the EFL reinstate Bury in League Two in 2020–21, the EFL said it would consult member clubs. The EFL also announced an independent review of EFL regulations concerning the financial sustainability of member clubs, which in February 2020 concluded that any additional EFL action "would not have made any difference to the eventual outcome" – "a lack of owner funding" ultimately caused Bury's demise, exacerbated by excessive wages paid to players under Day's chairmanship. Meanwhile, Greater Manchester Police confirmed it was investigating a fraud allegation made in June 2019 in relation to Bury's finances. The Frith-led working group's proposal to admit Bury to League Two (backed by the Bury FC Supporters' Trust, Bury South MP Ivan Lewis, Andy Burnham, the Greater Manchester Combined Authority and Bury Metropolitan Borough Council) was sent to the EFL on 20 September, but was rejected at a meeting of the EFL's remaining 71 member clubs on 26 September. Following the EFL ruling, the working group suggested that Bury apply for a place in the National League in 2020–21, subject to ownership and financial issues being resolved.

Another winding-up petition was brought before the High Court by HMRC on 16 October 2019. It was adjourned for 14 days to allow the club more time to settle with small business creditors. Everton chairman Bill Kenwright attempted to give Bury £1m to help save the club, but this was disallowed under EFL conflict of interest rules. On 30 October, the petition adjournment was extended for another 35 days to 4 December after the club argued that it had continued to automatically pay taxes on unpaid wages. The judge agreed that an extension was necessary for HMRC to establish if the club had overpaid. On 4 December, the club was granted a further extension until 18 December with HMRC ordered to process the club's returns and ascertain the exact amount still owed. When the High Court reconvened, this winding-up petition was dismissed (HMRC said an unspecified debt had been paid), as was a further winding-up petition on 5 February 2020, so "despite not having a league to play in, Bury ... still exist".

Three plans emerged during December 2019. A group of fans formed an intended phoenix club, Bury AFC, and applied to the North West Counties Football League (NWCFL) for membership in 2020–21, which was approved in February 2020. Entrepreneur Robert Benwell was reported to be seeking to resurrect Bury FC, but it was unclear if he would attempt to buy the original club. A consortium was looking to complete a solvent takeover of the club.

On 31 January 2020, the club was in danger of liquidation as Dale had failed to pay any money to creditors under the terms of the July 2019 CVA. Dale had to pay at least £2m by 11 February or the CVA would be ended; debts totalling around £5m would become immediately due, with creditors able to petition for the club to be wound up. On 14 February, Dale was reported to have defaulted on the plan to settle outstanding debts, casting fresh doubt over Bury's future, and making liquidation more likely. A month later, on 16 March 2020, Dale was reported to be seeking a new CVA; this followed a formal notice that the previous CVA had been terminated on 9 March. The supervisor of that initial CVA, Steven Wiseglass, warned that if no new CVA is agreed by 1 April, he would seek to wind-up the club and appoint a liquidator. The consortium attempt to complete a solvent takeover of the club fell through at the end of March. In late April, Dale was reported to have spent £250,000 in appointing a QC to lead a legal claim for damages against the EFL, and to have applied to the FA for a place in the National League or National League North (tiers five or six) in the 2020–21 season. However, on 7 August, the application was rejected by the FA, who cited the club's "financial resources, ownership and insolvency status"; the club said it planned to submit an application for the 2021–22 season, but none was sent.

On 30 August 2020, 12 months after the club's EFL expulsion, the Manchester Evening News said: "Bury FC still exists, though, if only on paper. With no players, no league to play in, and no employees to speak of, it is little more than a hollow shell of the club fans knew and loved." The MEN report said that the club "continues to limp on" but its future was uncertain and the danger of liquidation remained, though most fans still hoped for an eventual resurrection. Meanwhile, Dale began making statements on the club website, branding the fan-owned Bury AFC as "fake". Bury AFC had arranged a groundshare deal with nearby Radcliffe FC and began the 2020–21 season in Division One North of the NWCFL.

Administration 
On 27 November 2020, Dale placed the club into administration, with Wiseglass appointed administrator. In January 2021, a Nottinghamshire-based businessman and investor in Ilkeston Town, David Hilton, was reported to be interested in buying Bury FC, which was said to have debts of over £15 million.

In May 2021, the club's Gigg Lane ground was put up for sale by the administrator. In June, Wiseglass said he had received two ultimately unsuccessful offers to buy the club, and that a deadline of 5 August had been set for bids to buy Gigg Lane. He also confirmed, in an update to the administration records filed at Companies House, that the club's total liability amounted to £12,545,559. On 26 August, Wiseglass said offers had been received from several 'interested parties', with a fans-backed group, Est.1885, among the bidders to buy the ground and club. Supported by local MPs James Daly and Christian Wakeford and by Bury MBC, the Est.1885 bid was backed by an "anonymous benefactor willing to bankroll ambitions for a fans-led club". On 22 October, the administrators confirmed that Est.1885 had been given exclusivity to buy both the club and Gigg Lane. The benefactor was English-born but now California-based businessman Peter Alexander, a lifelong Shakers fan who also wanted to reconcile any differences with Bury AFC. On 23 December 2021, the UK Government, through the Community Ownership Fund run by the Department for Levelling Up, Housing and Communities, pledged £1m towards the bid to buy back Gigg Lane.

In November 2021, a court order was made extending the period of administration of The Bury Football Club Company Ltd to 27 May 2023 to allow time for the administrator to complete the sale of the stadium and to conclude investigations into the club's financial affairs and the actions of its current and former directors and officers.

Transfer of club assets from February 2022 
On 7 January 2022, Est.1885 said contracts had been exchanged on a deal to buy the stadium, the club's trading name and memorabilia, with plans to resume competitive football in August 2022. On 13 January, Bury MBC agreed a financial contribution of up to £450,000 towards the costs of recommissioning Gigg Lane (this was later made conditional on a successful merger with Bury AFC).

On 18 February, Est.1885 completed the purchase of Gigg Lane from the administrator and announced the acquisition of the club's trading name, history and memorabilia. Est.1885 had been assisted by the Forever Bury supporters' group and said they would soon announce "the rebranding and future role of Forever Bury and the transition of Est.1885". The statement also declared commitment towards "finding a consensual path with Bury AFC". Matt Pickup of Est.1885 said all parties had set a target of football returning to Gigg Lane by August 2022, in time for the 2022–23 season.

On 21 February 2022, it was confirmed that the owner of Gigg Lane – and of the Bury FC trading name – is the newly formed Gigg Lane Stadium Limited, a company limited by guarantee whose members are the Gigg Lane Propco Limited and Bury Football Club Supporters' Society Limited, a registered society. This means that, when a Bury FC team plays at Gigg Lane in future, it will represent Gigg Lane Stadium Limited. Meanwhile, the original club incorporated in 1885 – The Bury Football Club Company Ltd – remained in administration under the ownership of Steve Dale (its name was changed to CCFB Realisations 2022 Limited in April 2022 so that the new owner of the trading name could assume the original name; Dale was declared bankrupt in July 2022; Stewart Day was also declared bankrupt, in October 2022).

A Bury FC Supporters Society statement on 15 March 2022 said that the club's application to join the Northern Premier League had been rejected. While the FA and Bury MBC favoured a merger with Bury AFC (promoted to the NWCFL Premier Division on 26 March 2022), the statement recognised there were conflicting loyalties: "There are many supporters who have followed Bury AFC who are emotionally invested in the team and enjoying the success. We also have a significant number of supporters who did not choose this path and their feelings have to be seriously considered to avoid division and alienation." There were also FA restrictions about using the Bury FC name as football creditors to the old regime had not been paid.

Bury AFC enquired about renting Gigg Lane but the request was rejected on 5 April 2022 as "not feasible" by the Bury FC Supporters Society who cited commercial risks and imbalances that could jeopardise a future merger with Bury AFC.

May 2022-March 2023 - Proposed merger with Bury AFC 

In May 2022, the Bury FC Supporters Society signed a memorandum of understanding (MoU) regarding the future of the club. Other signatories included Bury MBC, the Football Supporters' Association, Greater Manchester Combined Authority, Shakers Community Society on behalf of Bury AFC, and The Bury Football Club Company Ltd. The MoU set out objectives including bringing professional football back to Bury, and uniting and growing the fan base. In July 2022, Bury fans were asked to back a merger of the two principal supporters' groups (BFCSS and the Shakers Community Society) to bring Bury FC back to its "spiritual home with wider benefits for the whole community". If the merger was agreed, Bury MBC would provide £450,000, which would in turn release a further £300,000 from the government (the balance of a previously provided grant under the Community Ownership Fund), enabling the return of a new Bury FC to Gigg Lane in time for the 2023–24 season. Tensions between Bury FC's and Bury AFC's women's teams about use of Gigg Lane hampered negotiations, as did wider tensions between the BFCSS and the Shakers Community Society. A Bury FC fans protest against the merger led to games at Radcliffe Juniors FC's playing fields being cancelled on 3 September 2022, while a 12-year old girl and a player were injured after a flare was thrown during Bury AFC's televised FA Cup tie against North Shields on the same day, though it was unclear if this incident was linked to the protest.

In October 2022, local football supporters were urged to vote in a poll, facilitated by the Football Supporters' Association, regarding a potential amalgamation of BFCSS (who own Gigg Lane and the Bury FC name) and the Shakers Community Society (who own the separate phoenix club, Bury AFC). Warned by the FSA that there was no "viable and sustainable alternative to the merger", the two groups both recommended their members to vote in favour. If the merger was agreed at special meetings on 28 October and 11 November, a new society - The Football Supporters' Society of Bury - would be formed, based at Gigg Lane, while Bury AFC would change its playing name to Bury Football Club. However, amid continuing tensions between the two groups, the proposals failed to reach the required 66% threshold from both societies; the Shakers Community Society voted 94% in favour while the BFCSS vote in favour fell short, at 63%. Within hours of the vote being declared on 28 October 2022, Bury MBC announced it would "now not be making that [£450,000] funding available", but remained "happy to have further discussions with all concerned parties on the way forward". The BFCSS hoped to reopen talks with the Shakers group about new amalgamation proposals that members could agree to, and was open to changes of both societies' board members due to concerns about personalities: "No one person is bigger than Bury FC... and it is crucial that both societies are willing to address these concerns".

In January 2023, Bury AFC said it had made several proposals to BFCSS to return professional men's football to Gigg Lane, including a solution which might unlock the DLUHC Grant Funding Agreement to purchase the ground, but its proposals had been rejected. In late January 2023, it was reported that BFCSS had submitted a detailed proposal to the North West Counties Football League (NWCFL) to restart a professional football club at Gigg Lane, though some of the claims were disputed by the Shakers group. After the application was rejected by the NWCFL, the BFCSS proposed to apply to the West Lancashire League, saying it was of "paramount importance ... that men's football is played at Gigg Lane next season", while negotiating for a second vote on amalgamation with the Shakers group.

In March 2023, a second poll regarding a merger between Bury FC and Bury AFC was announced. BFCSS's Daniel Bowerbank talked about uniting the "broken fanbase", adding: "We've got a team with no stadium and then the other side with a stadium but no football team." Bury AFC's Phil Young said: "This is really the only way forward for us."

Colours and crest
The club's colours were always white and navy blue. Originally, the team wore a striped shirt with blue shorts but the stripes were replaced by the long-established all-white shirt before the club joined the Football League in 1894. There was an exception in the 1962–63 season when a mistake was made by the club's kit suppliers, who sent a consignment of royal blue shorts before the season instead of the usual navy blue. Then manager Bob Stokoe said the club could have sent them back but decided simply to keep them for the season; he joked that royal blue "would tone with the Gigg Lane paintwork."

The crest on the shirt is a representation of the coat of arms granted to the former County Borough of Bury by the College of Arms on 28 February 1877. This depicts the town's industrial heritage with images in the shield of an anvil, a fleece, shuttles and a papyrus plant which respectively represent forging, wool, cotton and paper. It bears the inscription Vincit Omnia Industria (work conquers all).

Stadium

Bury have played at Gigg Lane since 1885 when they rented the plot from the Earl of Derby's estate soon after the club's foundation. The first Football League match played there was on 8 September 1894 when Bury defeated Manchester City 4–2. A floodlit match took place in 1889 but there were no permanent lights until 1953. Until the 1990s when a complete rebuild became necessary, the capacity of the ground was 35,000. That total was achieved when Bury hosted an FA Cup third-round tie against neighbouring Bolton Wanderers on 9 January 1960. The game ended 1–1, but Bury lost the replay 4–2 after extra time.

Gigg Lane was rebuilt in the 1990s and now has a capacity of 12,500, all seated and covered. The Main Stand, also called the Family Stand, is on the northern side and houses the club offices and dressing rooms. At the western end, the Manchester Road End houses away supporters. The South Stand (also known as the Les Hart Stand) is opposite the Main Stand and adjoins the Cemetery End, left (east) of the Main Stand. The Cemetery End was the last part of the rebuilt stadium to be completed, in 1999.

In August 2019, when Bury FC was expelled from the EFL, Gigg Lane was officially known for sponsorship purposes as the Planet-U Energy Stadium, and it was completely powered by renewable energy provided by the sponsors. Previous deals had seen the ground named the JD Stadium, and the Energy Check Stadium.

Players and coaching staff
All contracted players became free agents after the club was expelled from the EFL. Similarly, all team management and coaching positions became vacant after the expulsion, leaving the club with no players and no staff.

Full international players

Jimmy Settle was the first Bury player to win a full international cap, playing for England against Ireland in Sunderland on 18 February 1899, and scoring a second-half hat-trick in England's 13–2 victory. Bill Gorman and Derek Spence were Bury's most capped international players, each earning 10 caps while at Bury, for Ireland and Northern Ireland respectively. Neil Danns was the most recent Bury player to win a full international cap, on 26 June 2019, when he played in Guyana's third and final 2019 CONCACAF Gold Cup group stage game, against Trinidad.

Jack Plant played for Bury for 17 years apart from one short loan period at Reading. He played and scored in both the 1900 and 1903 FA Cup Finals, and made one international appearance for England against Scotland in 1900.

1 Danns scored three goals in qualifying games, then three in three games in the 2019 CONCACAF Gold Cup group stage.

Other notable players
Other notable players, with full international caps after or before their times at Bury, include:
Colin Bell, a midfielder signed from Horden Colliery Welfare as a youth player, played 82 times for Bury, scoring 25 times, between July 1963 and March 1966, and became club captain in 1964 while still a teenager. He joined Manchester City and made 48 international England appearances.
Luther Blissett, a centre-forward with 14 England caps, was signed from Watford, aged 35, in August 1993 and played ten games for Bury, scoring once, before a move into non-league football.
Forward Colin Kazim-Richards started his career as a 15-year-old at Bury in 2004, later going on to play for Turkey.
Goalkeeper Neville Southall played 49 games at the start of his career for Bury before a 1981 move to Everton and 92 caps for Wales.

Managerial history

The club was founded in 1885 but there is no record of anyone managing the team until Tom Hargreaves, who was a committee member, in 1890. One or more committee members took team responsibility until the appointment of erstwhile goalkeeper Archie Montgomery in 1907 as the first specialist team manager. Montgomery was dismissed during World War One for financial reasons but the first manager to be sacked for poor results was James Hunter-Thompson in February 1927, even though his team had achieved the club's highest-ever league position, finishing fourth in 1925–26.

Norman Bullock, who was the club's then-record goalscorer, took over in December 1935 but went to Chesterfield in June 1938. After the Second World War, Bullock returned to Bury until November 1949 when he went to Leicester City. The club's longest-serving manager has been Dave Russell for eight years from December 1953 to December 1961. The highlight of his career was winning the Third Division championship in 1960–61. Bob Stokoe was team manager twice between 1961 and 1978. In the early 1970s, Allan Brown held the post for eighteen months before moving to Nottingham Forest where, until 3 January 1975, he was Brian Clough's predecessor.

With Bury consigned to the lower leagues from the 1970s onwards, there have been several sackings as successive managers were unable to
regain Second Division status. A measure of success was finally achieved in the late 1990s when Stan Ternent inspired the team to successive promotions from fourth tier to third in 1995–96 and, as champions, from third to second in 1996–97. He left in 1998 to take over at Burnley and, a couple of seasons later, Bury were back in the lower league where they have stayed amid worrying financial issues. The club had a disastrous season in 2017–18 when the team finished bottom of League One and two managers were sacked. The club's former striker Ryan Lowe took full charge in May 2018, having twice been caretaker in 2017–18, before leaving in June 2019 to join Plymouth Argyle. On 2 July 2019, Paul Wilkinson was appointed as manager, but managed no first team games due to the club's EFL expulsion the following month.

Bury FC Women
As women's football developed in the 1990s, Bury became one of several professional clubs to establish a ladies' team or to accept an existing one as an affiliate. Bury FC Women, also known as the Bury FC Foundation Women's Team, was founded in 1996. They were founder members of the North West Women's Regional Football League (NWWRFL) Premier Division in 2003–04. They played in the NWWFRL for 16 seasons. In the 2018–19 season, they won the Division One North championship, earning promotion back to the Premier Division, which is now the fifth tier of the women's football pyramid. After Bury FC collapsed, the ladies' team lost many of its players and had to rely on charitable funding. They managed to stay afloat but were obliged to seek membership of a lower league.

The ladies' team played numerous matches at Gigg Lane until 2019. After its closure that year, their home venue was the Goshen Sports Centre on Tennyson Avenue in Bury. On Sunday, 24 April 2022, they returned to Gigg Lane for a Lancashire FA Women's County League match against Fleetwood Town Wrens. This was the first match of any kind to be played there since May 2019. Bury FC Women won 3–0 (1–0 at half-time) before a crowd of almost 500, the goalscorers being Lucy Golding, Kimberley Tyson and Sophie Coates.

In the 2021–22 season, Bury FC Women were managed by Colin Platt and played in the eighth tier Championship Division of the Lancashire FA Women's County League. On 15 May 2022, they won the division title by defeating second-placed Clitheroe Wolves Ladies 2–0 at Gigg Lane, both goals scored by Kimberley Tyson. The match attracted a crowd of 655, a ground record  for a ladies' match. Two days later, the Bury FC Supporters Society announced that a Service Level Agreement will ensure Bury FC Women's future home fixtures will be played at Gigg Lane.

Honours

League championships
First tier – Football League First Division / Premier League (0)
Highest position: 4th in 1925–26
Second tier – Football League Second Division / Division One / Championship (1): 1894–95
Runners-up (1): 1923–24 (promoted)
Third tier – Football League Third Division / Division Two / League One (2): 1960–61, 1996–97
Runners-up (1): 1967–68 (promoted)
Fourth tier – Football League Fourth Division / Division Three / League Two (0)
Runners-up (2): 2010–11 (promoted), 2018–19 (promoted)
Other promotions (4): 1973–74 (fourth), 1984–85 (fourth), 1995–96 (third), 2014–15 (third)

Cup competitions 
FA Cup
Winners (2): 1899–1900, 1902–03

League Cup
Semi-finals: 1962–63

League Trophy
Semi-finals: 2018–19

Football World Championship: 
Winners (1): 1904 (Anglo-Scottish competition, 1876–1904)

Wartime tournaments
Winners (1): North West League, 1939–40

Other tournaments
Lancashire League (2): 1890–91, 1891–92
Lancashire Cup (11): 1892, 1899, 1903, 1906, 1926, 1958, 1983, 1987, 2014, 2015, 2018
Lancashire Junior Cup (1): 1890
Manchester Cup (12): 1894, 1896, 1897, 1900, 1903, 1905, 1925, 1935, 1951, 1952, 1962, 1968

Records and statistics

English football records
 Bury jointly (with Manchester City, 2019) hold the record for the widest winning margin in an FA Cup Final (6–0 v Derby County, 1903).
 In 2005, Bury became the first (and still only) club to score 1,000 goals in each of the four professional tiers in England.

Club records
The club's records are listed on its own website:
 Record league victory: 8–0 v Tranmere Rovers, Third Division, 10 January 1970
 Record cup victory: 12–1 v Stockton, FA Cup first round replay, 2 February 1897
 Record league defeat: 0–8 Sheffield United, First Division, 6 April 1896; 0–8 Swindon Town, Third Division, 8 December 1979
 Record cup defeat: 0–10 West Ham United, League Cup second round, 25 October 1983
 Most points in a league season: 85, League Two, 2014–15
 Most wins in a league season: 30, Third Division, 1960–61
 Most goals in a league season: 108, Third Division, 1960–61
 Top goalscorer in a season: Craig Madden, 43 goals in 1981–82 (35 league & 8 Cup)
 Top goalscorer in a career: Craig Madden, 153 (129 league, 25 cup) goals from 1977 to 1986
 Most appearances: Norman Bullock, 539 (506 league, 33 Cup) games from 1920 to 1935
 Youngest player in a league game: Jimmy Kerr – 16 years and 15 days
 Oldest player in a league game: Bruce Grobbelaar – 40 years and 337 days
 Most capped players: Bill Gorman, 10 caps for Ireland and Derek Spence, 10 caps for Northern Ireland
 Record attendance: 35,000 v Bolton Wanderers, FA Cup third round, 9 January 1960
 Most undefeated league matches: 18 games – 1960–61, 2002–03
 Most undefeated home games: 25 – 1967–68 season
 Most undefeated away matches: 11 – 2015
 Most games consecutively scored in: Ryan Lowe, 9 games in 2010–11

Support
The club has a supporter's group called Forever Bury, founded in 2002, who strive to help the club face its financial difficulties. In 2019, they ran a campaign called "Help Save Our Club". Bury have had a club mascot operating on the sidelines since 1997. The first, named after Robert Peel, was "Robbie the Bobby", a cartoon policeman whose antics embarrassed the club when he was sent off the field by referees three times in 2001 for bad behaviour – one of a number of incidents involving mascots that led to a Football League review of mascot behaviour. He was retired in 2018 to be replaced by a cartoon police dog. The club explained that "police dogs are key members of the force and are something the younger supporters can relate to". Following a children's naming competition, the new mascot was named "Peeler" to maintain the link with Peel and he made his debut in the home match against Yeovil Town on 4 August 2018.

Rivalries
Bury's ground is near to several other Football League clubs and so, in any season, they were likely to play at least one "derby" match (e.g., Oldham Athletic in 2018–19). Traditionally, Bury's main rivalry has always been with their nearest neighbour Bolton Wanderers. For many seasons from the late 1990s, however, the two clubs rarely met as Bolton were in the Premier League or the Championship while Bury were in the lower divisions. The head-to-head record between them is 30 wins each and 19 draws. In recent years, matches between Bury and Rochdale have been dubbed the "M66 Derby" and their head-to-head record is 26 wins by Bury and 21 wins by Rochdale with 21 draws.

References

External links

 Bury FC
 Est.1885

 
1885 establishments in England
Association football clubs established in 1885
FA Cup winners
Football clubs in England
Football clubs in the Metropolitan Borough of Bury
Former English Football League clubs
Lancashire League (football)